"Love You Inside Out" is a 1979 hit single by the Bee Gees from their album, Spirits Having Flown. It reached number one on the Billboard Hot 100 for one week in June 1979, interrupting Donna Summer's "Hot Stuff", becoming the third single from the album to do so. In the UK, the single peaked at No. 13 for two weeks.  It was the ninth and final number-one hit for the Bee Gees in the US, and the eleventh and final number-one hit in Canada as well. The trio would not return to the top 10 for ten years, with the song, "One".

Background
The song is a slow funk groove number. During recording, the Bee Gees played a prank on their manager Robert Stigwood, sending him a version with the line "backwards and forwards with my cock hanging out" to see if he was paying attention to their work. For the released version, the line is "backwards and forwards with my heart hanging out".

Achievements
"Love You Inside Out" was a milestone single for the Bee Gees, earning them a permanent place in rock history when it reached number one on the US Billboard charts. It was the group's ninth number one single in the US (tenth if you include "Lonely Days", which reached number one on the Cashbox charts in 1971), more number-one singles than any other 1970s’ artist. It was also The Bee Gees’ sixth consecutive number-one single in a single year; the only other group to achieve this was The Beatles. Moreover, it was the third consecutive number-one single from Spirits Having Flown, which followed three consecutive number-one singles from their previous album Saturday Night Fever. At that point, no other artist had ever had three consecutive number-one singles from two successive albums. It also placed them fourth among all artists with number one singles (9) and fourth in total weeks (27) at number one.

The song debuted at #28 in the United Kingdom.

Reception
Billboard called it a "disco flavored hook laden lune that is paced by its patented falsetto and harmonies ."  Billboard picked "Love You Inside Out" as one of the best cuts on Spirits Having Flown.  Cash Box called it a "finely arranged and performed love song."  Record World said it "has light disco overtones and [the Bee Gees'] high vocal harmonies."

Smash Hits called it a, "mellow, mid-tempo jog, which is typically well-produced and typically shrill in the vocal department. I have to admit, I think it's dull. Not bad, just dull.

Personnel
Barry Gibb – lead, harmony and backing vocals, acoustic guitar
Robin Gibb – backing vocals
Maurice Gibb – bass, backing vocals
Alan Kendall – electric guitar
Dennis Bryon – drums
Blue Weaver – synthesizer, keyboards, programming
George Terry – electric guitar

Chart performance

Weekly charts

Year-end charts

Cover versions
In 1996, the R&B group Total sampled the song on the album track "When Boy Meets Girl" from their self-titled debut in 1996. In 2004, the song was covered by Feist (under the title "Inside and Out") on her 2004 album Let It Die. It was released as the third single from the album in 2005. Saxophonist Arturo Tappin's smooth jazz version (Love You Inside and Out) is on his 2007 "Inside Out" album. "Love You Inside Out" was sampled by Snoop Dogg for his rap single "Ups & Downs" in 2005 on rap group Nemesis' hit "Cantifiguritout". This song was also sampled by R. Kelly and Jay-Z's hit song "Honey".

References

External links
 
 

1979 songs
1979 singles
Bee Gees songs
British disco songs
British funk songs
Billboard Hot 100 number-one singles
RPM Top Singles number-one singles
Feist (singer) songs
Songs written by Barry Gibb
Songs written by Maurice Gibb
Songs written by Robin Gibb
Song recordings produced by Barry Gibb
Song recordings produced by Robin Gibb
Song recordings produced by Maurice Gibb
RSO Records singles